AKP MC College (அக்கரைப்பற்று முஸ்லிம் மத்திய கல்லூரி),  an education provider for the Muslim Community was founded in 1946 in the Green City of South Eastern Sri Lanka, Akkaraipattu. It became the sixteenth National Muslim School in Sri Lanka and third National School in the Eastern Province in 1992.

Primary school 
The primary school has students from grade 1-5.

Junior Secondary School 
Junior Secondary School comprises grade 6-9 . A school-based assessment system is introduced during this stage and students undergo evaluation on a weekly basis apart from term exam. An English Medium Secondary section runs parallel to the usual Tamil Medium.  A provincial level evaluation exam is held the end of Grade nine.

Senior Secondary School 
This comprises grades 10 – 13 with two segments i.e. Grades 10 and 11 for G.C.E Ordinary Level and Grades 12 and 13 for G.C.E Advanced Level. In ordinary level students sit for nine core subjects and three optional subjects. Advanced Level students are offered three compulsory subjects in four streams namely Biological Science, Physical Science, Commerce and Arts. A pass in the common general paper is compulsory to enter the university. IT and General English are offered.

Infrastructures 
Academic
 Class room blocks
 Libraries
 Multimedia Resource Center 
 Computer Learning Center
 Science laboratories
 Music room

Sports
 Play ground with pavilion
 Basketball court
 Indoor sports complex
 swimming pool with pavilion
 
Accommodation
 Boys hostel

Medical Service
 Dental Unit
 First Aid Unit
 Student Counseling Unit

Other
 Mosque
 Auditorium
 Administrative block
 Cafeteria

Notable alumni

External links 
Akkaraipattu

National schools in Sri Lanka
Schools in Ampara District